Frenchmoor is a hamlet and civil parish in the Test Valley district of Hampshire, England, close to the border with Wiltshire. According to the 2001 census it had a population of 25. Frenchmoor is roughly equisidiant between the larger settlements of East Tytherley and West Tytherley.

References

Villages in Hampshire
Test Valley